Linden Airport  is a mile southeast of downtown Linden, in Union County, New Jersey. Also known as Linden Municipal Airport, it is next to U.S. Route 1&9. The National Plan of Integrated Airport Systems for 2011–2015 categorized it as a general aviation reliever airport.

History 
During World War II General Motors automobile factory across the street from the airport called Linden Assembly, produced military aircraft.

When World War II started Grumman Aircraft Corporation contracted with the recently created Eastern Aircraft Corporation (a GM company) to take over the manufacture of the Wildcat and Avenger aircraft for the US Navy and its Allies.  This would allow Grumman to focus on the development and production of Hellcat. The Wildcat was manufactured in Linden, NJ and towed across the street to the Linden Airport for test flying and delivery.

Construction of Linden Airport was started in the spring of 1942 and completed by October 1942. During the war Eastern Aircraft produced about 3,600 FM-1 and FM-2 Wildcats. After the war Linden Airport was turned over to the city of Linden which still owns and operates the airport under contract.

The original airport with its intersecting runways and large hangar remained intact until 1998 when the City of Linden, needing more tax-ratable property decided to divide up the underutilized airport to create a shopping center called Aviation Plaza on the north side of the field. A new airport was built on the south side complete with new taxiways, hangars and parking areas. The only remaining part of the original airport is the west to east (9-27) runway.

The airport is the only non-towered (no control tower) airport in the New York City metro area. Its close proximity to New York City and relatively light air traffic makes it an ideal location for basing news helicopters for New York's news channels. The airport is home to many sightseeing and commuter helicopters that fill the skies over New York.

In 2010 Linden Airport hosted the New York City round of the Red Bull Air Race World Championship.

Facilities
Linden Airport covers 188 acres (76 ha) at an elevation of 22 feet (7 m). Its asphalt runway, 9/27, is 4,140 by 100 feet (1,262 x 30 m).

In the year ending January 8, 2002 the airport had 42,925 aircraft operations, average 117 per day: 99% general aviation and 1% military. 91 aircraft were then based at this airport: 70% single-engine, 18% helicopter, 11% multi-engine, and 1% jet.

Racing venue
The airport served as a temporary road racing course for the eighteenth race of the 1954 NASCAR Grand National (now NASCAR Cup Series) season. Al Keller won the 50-lap race over a  course on June 13 in a field of 43 cars. The rest of the top five finishers were Joe Eubanks, Baker, Bill Claren, and Bob Grossman. Finishing sixth through tenth: Larry LaVois, Herb Thomas, Dick Rathman, Laird Bruner, and Lee Petty.

See also 
 New Jersey World War II Army Airfields
 List of airports in New Jersey

References

External links 
 Linden Airport, official website
 Linden Airport (LDJ) from New Jersey DOT Airport Directory
 Aviation photos of Linden Airport at jetphotos.net
 Core Helicopters, a helicopter flight school located at the airport
 Aerial image as of March 1995 from USGS The National Map
 

Airports in New Jersey
Airports established in 1942
Transportation buildings and structures in Union County, New Jersey
Airfields of the United States Army Air Forces in New Jersey
NASCAR tracks
Linden, New Jersey
1942 establishments in New Jersey